Ralph Metzner (May 18, 1936 – March 14, 2019) was a German-born American psychologist, writer and researcher, who participated in psychedelic research at Harvard University in the early 1960s with Timothy Leary and Richard Alpert (later named Ram Dass). Metzner was a psychotherapist, and Professor Emeritus of psychology at the California Institute of Integral Studies in San Francisco, where he was formerly the Academic Dean and Academic Vice-president.

Early life 
Metzner was involved in consciousness research, including psychedelics, yoga, meditation and shamanism for over 50 years. He was a co-founder and President of the Green Earth Foundation, a non-profit educational organization devoted to healing and harmonizing the relationship between humans and the Earth. Metzner was featured in the 2006 film Entheogen: Awakening the Divine Within, a documentary about rediscovering an enchanted cosmos in the modern world.

He conducted workshops on consciousness transformation and alchemical divination, both nationally and internationally. He was also a poet and singer-songwriter and produced two CDs with Kit Walker: A spoken word CD ("Spirit Soundings," with music by Kit Walker) and one music CD of original songs ("Bardo Blues"). His books include The Well of Remembrance, The Unfolding Self, Green Psychology, and two edited collections on the science and the phenomenology of Ayahuasca and Teonanácatl, and a collection of reports about MDMA experiences. Metzner provided the foreword for Through the Gateway of the Heart: Accounts of Experiences with MDMA and Other Empathogenic Substances.

He received his Ph.D. in Psychology from Harvard.

Bibliography

(1979). Know Your Type: Maps of Identity (Anchor Press; 1st edition)

Discography
 1966 – The Psychedelic Experience: A Manual Based on the Tibetan Book of the Dead (with Richard Alpert & Timothy Leary) (reissued on CD in 2003 by Folkways)
 2006 – Bardo Blues – and Other Songs of Liberation (with Kit Walker) Music CD (Green Earth Foundation)
 2009 – Cognition Factor (2009)

References

External links

 Ralph Metzner's The Web of Life (Song, 2009, 15 min)
 Through the Gateway of the Heart, Second Edition - Accounts and Experiences with MDMA and other Empathogenic Substances

1936 births
2019 deaths
American male non-fiction writers
American psychology writers
German emigrants to the United States
Psychedelic drug researchers
American psychedelic drug advocates
Harvard University alumni
20th-century American psychologists